Sir Charles Arthur Turner, K.C.I.E (6 March 1833 – 20 October 1907) was a British jurist mainly operational in India, Chief Justice of Madras High Court. He was the first barrister judge appointed directly to the Allahabad High Court from England.

Early life

Turner was born to Reverend John Fisher Turner at Exeter, England. After completion of study at Exeter Grammar School and at Exeter College Oxford, he was called to the Bar by Lincoln's Inn in 1858.

Career
He was appointed puisne Judge in Allahabad High Court in 1866 and served there for twelve years. In 1879 he became the Chief Justice of Madras High Court after Sir Walter Morgan and served since 1879 to 1885. He held the post of Vice-Chancellor of Madras University In 1880 and 1882. Sir  Charles Turner also served  as a member of the Law Commission of India and Public Service Commission with Sir Charles Umpherston Aitchison in 1886. He was awarded Knight Commander of the Order of the Indian Empire on 1st January 1888 on becoming Chief Justice. He became a judicial member as well as vice president of the Council of India. Turner died in London in 1907. He is buried in Brompton Cemetery between the central colonnades.

References

1833 births
1907 deaths
Knights Commander of the Order of the Indian Empire
Chief Justices of the Madras High Court
British India judges
Members of Lincoln's Inn
19th-century English judges
Vice Chancellors of the University of Madras
People educated at Exeter School